United Kingdom casualties of war lists deaths of British armed forces and British citizens caused by conflicts in which the United Kingdom was involved.

Post World War II

1900 to 1945

1815 to 1898

See also
 List of disasters in Great Britain and Ireland by death toll

References

External links
 - page from The Armed Forces Memorial Project
 - page from Sovereignty.org.uk
 - Lists of UK Security Force Casualties
 - Lists of Officers died - Canada 1750-1761 through to 2009
 - Lists of NCOs and other ranks died - New Zealand 1845-47 onwards

 
Military history of the United Kingdom